Lady Beatrix Stanley (née Taylour), (1877 – 3 May 1944) was a British aristocrat, horticulturalist, and botanical artist who drew plants native to Chennai, and consequently has multiple flower strains named after her, most notably an iris and snowdrop, such as Galanthus ‘Lady Beatrix Stanley’, a double snowdrop, which was named after her in 1981.

Life 
Stanley was born in 1877 to Thomas Taylour, the 3rd Marquess of Headfort, and his wife Emila Costantia. In 1903, at the age of 26, she married George Stanley, and they had a daughter, Barbara Helen Stanley (1906-1986), three years later. Her and an infant Barbara starred on the cover of Country Life magazine in July 1907.  In 1929 Stanley's husband was made governor of Madras in the British Raj. Stanley's body of watercolour work was created during her residency in India, in Ootacamund. She studied the plants and gardening practises in the local climate with local fauna, as well as British plants which had been imported. The family returned to the UK in 1934 after the end of British governance in India.

Stanley also wrote about horticulture, including the article “Gardening in India,” published in the May 23, 1931 edition of The Gardener’s Chronicle. She also became editor of an RHS publication, The New Flora and Fauna, 1938 through 1940.

In 1938 Stanley's husband died. Stanley herself died six years later at their family home of Sibbertoft Manor, Market Harborough.

Stanley's daughter Barbara married Major Sir Charles James Buchanan. Through their descendants the bulbs that Stanley was so passionate about continue to be grown at the historic Hodsock Priory. The property and Stanley's watercolours are owned by Stanley's great-grandson, Andrew Buchanan.

References 

1877 births
1944 deaths
British horticulturists
British botanists
British painters
Daughters of British marquesses
Women horticulturists and gardeners
British women botanists